James King Gibson (February 18, 1812 – March 30, 1879) was a nineteenth-century American politician, merchant, sheriff and banker from Virginia. He served one term in the United States House of Representatives.

Early life
James King Gibson was born in Abingdon, Virginia on February 18, 1812. He attended the common schools as a child. He moved to Huntsville, Alabama in 1833, but moved back to Abingdon in 1834 and engaged in mercantile pursuits.

Career
He was deputy sheriff of Washington County, Virginia in 1834 and 1835 and was appointed postmaster of Abingdon in 1837, serving until 1849. Gibson was elected as a Conservative to the United States House of Representatives in 1869, serving in the 41st U.S. Congress from January 28, 1870, to March 3, 1871. Gibson declined reelection in 1870 and engaged in agricultural pursuits and banking.

Death
Gibson died in Abingdon on March 30, 1879. He was interred there in Sinking Spring Cemetery.

References

External links

1812 births
1879 deaths
Members of the United States House of Representatives from Virginia
Virginia postmasters
Politicians from Huntsville, Alabama
Politicians from Abingdon, Virginia
Conservative Party of Virginia members of the United States House of Representatives
19th-century American politicians
Virginia sheriffs